Frau Sixta is a 1938 German historical drama film directed by Gustav Ucicky and starring Gustav Fröhlich, Franziska Kinz and Ilse Werner. It is based on the 1925 novel of the same title by the Swiss writer Ernst Zahn.

The film's sets were designed by the art directors Franz Koehn and Hans Kuhnert. It was shot at the Bavaria Studios in Munich and on location at the winter sports resort of Kühtai in the Austrian Tyrol.

Plot
In the 1860s a widow runs an estate, close to the Italian border. One day a former army officer arrives on his way to Italy. She persuades him to stay and work for her, and before long they begin a relationship. However, complications ensue when her daughter returns home from boarding school and develops an attachment to her mother's lover.

Cast
Gustav Fröhlich as Markus 
Franziska Kinz as Frau Sixta 
Ilse Werner as Otti, their daughter
Josefine Dora as Dora, Beschließerin 
Josef Eichheim as Hannes 
Beppo Brem as Korbinian 
Gustav Waldau as Baron Kramer 
Eduard Köck as Pankraz, the old servant 
Heidemarie Hatheyer as Anna, waitress 
Willy Rösner as Forcher, community leader 
Ernst Pröckl as district governor
Hertha von Hagen as matron
Walter Holten as customs inspector 
Karl Theodor Langen as municipal secretary 
Rolf Pinegger as Brandner 
Thea Aichbichler as Brandnerin

References

External links

Films of Nazi Germany
Films directed by Gustav Ucicky
German black-and-white films
UFA GmbH films
Films shot at Bavaria Studios
Films shot in Austria
Films set in Austria
Films set in the 1860s
German historical drama films
1930s historical drama films
Films based on Swiss novels
Films set in the Alps
1938 drama films
1930s German films
1930s German-language films